Persikasi stands for Persatuan Sepakbola Indonesia Kabupaten Bekasi is an  Indonesian football club based in Bekasi Regency, West Java. They play in Liga 3.

Persikasi have a rivalry with Persipasi Bekasi so called Bekasi derby.

Players

Current squad

Achievements & honors
Liga Indonesia Third Division
Winners (1): 2009

Liga Indonesia Second Division
Winners (1): 2009-10

References

External links
Liga-Indonesia.co.id
 

Football clubs in Indonesia
Football clubs in West Java
Association football clubs established in 1961
1961 establishments in Indonesia